Köditz is a municipality in Upper Franconia in the district of Hof in Bavaria in Germany.

References

Hof (district)